Magna may refer to:

Companies
 Magna (bicycle company)
 Magna Corporation, an American public company
 Magna Entertainment Corp., gaming and horse racing company
 Magna Home Entertainment, entertainment distributor also known as Magna Pacific
 Magna International, Canadian automotive supplier
 Magna Publishing Group, American publisher of pornography
 Magna Steyr, automobile manufacturer in Graz, Austria

Ancient Rome
 Magnis (Carvoran), a now ruined Roman fort, also known as Magna, at Carvoran, Northumberland, UK 
 Leptis Magna, ancient Roman city in Libya
 Plancia Magna (fl. 1st century CE), prominent woman from Anatolia during the Roman Empire

Other
 Magna (moth), genus of the family Erebidae
 Magna (paint), brand name of an acrylic resin paint
 Magna, Utah
 Mitsubishi Magna, automobile
 Honda Magna, motorcycle
 Magna cum laude, distinction with which an academic degree is earned
 Magna Defender, character from the Power Rangers Lost Galaxy TV series
 Marcus Magna (born 1988), French professional footballer
 Magna Science Adventure Centre, educational visitor attraction in Rotherham, England
 Magna (The Walking Dead), a fictional character from The Walking Dead

See also
 MAGNA awards, Australian museum awards
 Magnum (disambiguation)
 Magnus (disambiguation)
 Magnis (disambiguation)
 Magna Carta (disambiguation)